Carnan Cruithneachd (728 m) is a mountain in the Northwest Highlands of Scotland. It is located in the Kintail area of Ross-shire, on the southern side of Glen Elchaig.

The peak has a very steep northern face, but its other side's are more gentle and form a gentle plateau. The nearest village is Dornie to its west.

References

Marilyns of Scotland
Grahams
Mountains and hills of the Northwest Highlands